Zaky is a surname. Notable people with the surname include:

Adel Zaky (1947–2019), Egyptian Roman Catholic prelate
Chantal Zaky (born 1988), Jamaican-American model and beauty pageant titleholder
Hussein Zaky (born 1979), Egyptian handball player